Cerrostrangalia solisi is a species of beetle in the family Cerambycidae. It was described by Hovore and Chemsak in 2005.

References

Lepturinae
Beetles described in 2005